North High School is a public 9-12 high school located in North Saint Paul, Minnesota, United States.  It is one of two high schools in the ISD 622 District. The other high school in ISD 622 is Tartan Senior High School in Oakdale, Minnesota.

History
Founded in 1905, North High School has been forced to rebuild on five occasions due to growing enrollment. In 2005 North High celebrated its centennial.

In 2010 Newsweek named North High as one of the top 1,300 schools in the country.

A new school building was constructed with the school planned to stand four floors high. This however was cut to three to stay within the budget. The school was also encased in bricks halfway up the exterior of the building, also as to not exceed the budget.

Geography
The school is located in North St. Paul, just on the other side of Minnesota State Highway 36 outside downtown North St. Paul. The school has a second campus due to the set back in construction of the new building that is located inside of the School District 622 Education Building which is located at the east end of the school's parking lot. The school is on the North side of Highway 36, but can no longer be seen from Highway 36; renovations on Highway 36 in 2008 bypass North Saint Paul.

Curriculum
North offers many higher-level classes, including multiple AP courses, PSEO enrollment at multiple colleges, as well as a participant in University of Minnesota's "College in the Schools" program.

Extracurricular activities
North High offers various extracurricular activities. They have athletic options such as volleyball, football, boys' and girls' soccer, boys' and girls' basketball, boys' and girls' cross country, boys' and girls' track, boys' and girls' swim and dive, boys' and girls' tennis, boys' and girls' golf, wrestling, baseball, boy's and girls' lacrosse, softball, boys' and girls' bowling, and boys' and girls' hockey. The boys' soccer team won the State Championship in 2013. The volleyball program has also had success making it to the section finals two years in a row.

Its music program offers a competitive show choir which is often called the Northern Lights Show Choir, as well as other choirs and a Symphonic Band. They also offer a world drumming class and a guitar class.

In addition to athletics, North also offers a variety of clubs and organizations such as JROTC, DECA, BPA, anime club, chess club, scuba club, National Honor Society, Student Council, rocket club, stargazers, robotics, math team, FCA, yearbook, Relay for Life, drama, debate team, ASL club, polar prints, knowledge bowl, FEA, Link Crew, Model UN, CARE, Pay it Forward, Science Olympiad, Prom, Golden Prom, Dicken's club,  and indoor drumline called the Fusion Drumline which is combined with Tartan High School as well as the middle schools of the district. North High's DECA program has been the number one chapter in the state for the past few years. DECA is a business class that is offered to students who strive to be in a career involving business. These students then run the school store during lunch and before and after school. DECA students also participate in district and state competitions, competing in events like advertising campaigns, role plays, written business plans, and sales demonstrations.

North High is also notable for being the initial school to host Rock For Life in 2011, a student-led Christian fellowship among the ISD 622 district and surrounding school districts.

Incidents
On Friday June 1, 2012, someone released smoke bombs on the last day of school which resulted in the evacuation of the entire school for approximately 90 minutes. Five students were treated by medics and none were taken to the hospital.

Notable alumni
 Clark Shaughnessy, College Football Hall of Fame coach
 Kip Sundgaard (1974) Olympic Ski Jumper
 Troy G. Ward (1980) Professional hockey coach: Pittsburgh Penguins, Houston Aeros, Abbotsford Heat
 Ira Dean (1987) Bass player and gold record recording artist with the band Trick Pony
 Bret Hedican (1988) Professional hockey player, husband of figure skater Kristi Yamaguchi
 Nate Richert (1996) Actor (Harvey on Sabrina the Teenage Witch), musician
 Allie Thunstrom (2006) NWHL Player for the Minnesota White Caps
 Jim O'Brien (ice hockey) (2007) NHL player for the Ottawa Senators
 Louie Varland (2015) MLB pitcher for the Minnesota Twins

References 

1905 establishments in Minnesota
Educational institutions established in 1905
Public high schools in Minnesota
Schools in Ramsey County, Minnesota